Ensina decisa is a species of tephritid or fruit flies in the genus Ensina of the family Tephritidae.

Distribution
Madeira, Canary Islands.

References

Tephritinae
Insects described in 1858
Diptera of Europe